SS Prinz Eitel Friedrich was a German passenger liner  which saw  service in the First World War as an auxiliary cruiser of the Imperial German Navy. Though largely overlooked, Prinz Eitel Friedrich was, after , the most successful of Germany’s first wave of auxiliary cruisers.

Early career
Prinz Eitel Friedrich was built for the Norddeutscher Lloyd, a former shipping company of the Hapag-Lloyd, by the AG Vulcan shipyard in Stettin, in 1904. For the ten years prior to the First World War she served on NDL routes in the Far East. On the eve of war in August 1914 she was at Shanghai, with orders to proceed to the German naval base at Tsingtao for conversion as an auxiliary cruiser (Hilfskreuzer).

Service history 

At Tsingtao Prinz Eitel Friedrich was equipped for her role as a commerce raider, receiving the armaments and crews of the aging gunboats Luchs, and Tiger.  KK Max Therichens, of Luchs, took command.

She was commissioned on 5 August 1914 and sailed from Tsingtao the same day to join company with Admiral Graf von Spee and the German East Asia Squadron. These were at Pagan in the Caroline Islands, and Prinz Eitel Friedrich arrived there on 12 August.

On 13 August she was detached for independent operations with a remit to attack and destroy allied commerce. She sailed south to start this mission along the coast of Australia.

In March 1915, with her bunkers nearly empty and her engines worn out, Prinz Eitel Friedrich headed for the neutral United States, and on 11 March 1915 sailed into Newport News harbour.

Armament 

Four 10.5 cm SK L/40 cannons. Two each mounted fore and aft. The port aft gun pictured at right.

An original 10.5 cm SK L/40 naval gun from Prinz Eitel Friedrich can be seen at Memorial Park in Cambridge, New York.

Table 

 William P Frye was the first U.S. ship sunk during World War I. Its sinking contributed to the neutral U.S. entering the war.

Internment and United States flag 

Prinz Eitel Friedrich failed to leave the neutral port in the time prescribed by international law and was interned on 9 April 1915. The ship, still under the German flag, moved, was moved to the Philadelphia Navy Yard where, upon the United States declaration of war with Germany on 6 April 1917, she was seized by U.S. Customs officials and then transferred to the Navy.

U.S. Naval service 
Reconditioned and refitted as a troop transport and given the identification number (Id.No.) 3010, she was renamed and commissioned  at the Philadelphia Navy Yard on 12 May 1917. DeKalb served for the remainder of the war as a troopship on the trans Atlantic route.

Immigrant ship
The ship was acquired by W. Averell Harriman and included with ten previous ships acquired from the Kerr Navigation Company in a name change so that all were prefixed with an American mountain and thus renamed Mount Clay.  The ship was specially modified to be a steerage only immigrant ship for the United American Line of New York. Mount Clay made the initial voyage as an immigrant ship on Christmas Day 1920 (Marine Review) or 26 December (DANFS).

Mount Clay made the last westbound voyage from Hamburg to New York on 15 October 1925 and was laid up until scrapped in 1934.

References

External links

Ships of Norddeutscher Lloyd
World War I commerce raiders
1904 ships
Auxiliary cruisers of the Imperial German Navy